Mongolia competed at the 2012 Summer Paralympics in London, United Kingdom from August 29 to September 9, 2012.

Archery 

Women

|-
|align=left|Oyun-Erdene Buyanjargal
|align=left rowspan=2|Indi. recurve standing
|516
|11
|
| (6) L 2-6
|colspan=4|Did not advance
|-
|align=left|Javzmaa Byambasuren
|524
|8
|
| (9) W 6-4
| (1) W 6-0
| (4) L 3-7
| (2) L 2-6
|4
|}

Athletics 

Men’s Field Events

Judo

Shooting 

Women

See also

 Mongolia at the 2012 Summer Olympics

References

Nations at the 2012 Summer Paralympics
2012
2012 in Mongolian sport